The 2013 Northern Illinois Huskies football team represented Northern Illinois University as a member of the West Division of the Mid-American Conference (MAC) during the 2013 NCAA Division I FBS football season. Led by first-year head coach Rod Carey, the Huskies compiled an overall record of 12–2 with a mark of  8–0 in conference play, won the MAC West Division title, and advanced to the MAC Championship Game, where they lost to East Division champion Bowling Green. Northern Illinois was invited to the Poinsettia Bowl, where they lost to Utah State. The team played home games at Huskie Stadium in DeKalb, Illinois.

Fresh off their Orange Bowl appearance the previous season, the Huskies went undefeated until the MAC Championship Game. This garnered national attention with the anticipation of another Bowl Championship Series (BCS) bowl appearance. Starting quarterback Jordan Lynch finished third in voting for the Heisman Trophy. The season marked the Huskies' sixth consecutive trip to a bowl game and their second consecutive bowl game loss.

Schedule

Rankings

Roster

Game summaries

Iowa

Sources:

Jordan Lynch threw for three touchdowns and ran for two more, as the team came away with their second win of the season.

Eastern Illinois

Sources:

Jordan Lynch threw for 207 yards and three touchdowns, and Northern Illinois scored on a kickoff return and an interception return to rout Purdue 55–24.
It's the first time a Mid-American Conference team has beaten two Big Ten foes during the same regular season, and the Huskies made it look easy, tying the MAC record for victory margin over a Big Ten school. Toledo beat Minnesota by 31 in 2001.

Kent State

Sources:

Cameron Stingily ran for a career-high 266 yards and two scores as Northern Illinois remained undefeated with a 38–24 win over Kent State.

Akron

Sources:

The Huskies used their defense and kicking game to beat Akron 27–20 on Saturday night after the offense went 1 for 15 on third-down conversions.

Central Michigan

Sources:

Lynch had three rushing touchdowns and was 20 for 30 through the air for 155 yards and another score to help Northern Illinois (7–0, 3–0 Mid-American) extend the nation's best conference winning streak to 20 games. Lynch rushed for 316 yards, an FBS record for a quarterback, and the 23rd-ranked Huskies stayed unbeaten with a 38–17 victory at Central Michigan.

Eastern Michigan

Sources:

UMass

Sources:

Ball State

Sources:

Toledo

Sources:

Western Michigan

Sources:

Bowling Green (MAC Championship Game)

Sources:

Utah State (Poinsettia Bowl)

Sources:

Awards
Jamaal Bass
All-MAC First Team Outside Linebacker

Ken Bishop
All-MAC First Team Down Lineman
2x MAC West Division Defensive Player of the Week (Weeks 3, 10)

Da'Ron Brown
All-MAC Second Team Wide Receiver

Rod Carey
MAC Coach of the Year

Dechane Durante
All-MAC Third Team Defensive Back

Tommylee Lewis
All-MAC First Team Wide Receiver
1x MAC West Division Offensive Player of the Week (Week 3)
1x MAC West Division Special Teams Player of the Week (Week 5)

Tyler Loos
All-MAC First Team Offensive Lineman

Jordan Lynch
Vern Smith Leadership Award
MAC Offensive Player of the Year
All-MAC First Team Quarterback
7x MAC West Division Offensive Player of the Week (Weeks 1, 4, 5, 8, 10, 12, 13)

Mathew Sims
1x MAC West Division Special Teams Player of the Week (Week 1)

Cameron Stingily
1x MAC West Division Offensive Player of the Week (Week 6)

Jared Volk
All-MAC Second Team Offensive Lineman

Jimmie Ward
All-MAC First Team Defensive Back

Joe Windsor
All-MAC Third Team Down Lineman

References

Northern Illinois
Northern Illinois Huskies football seasons
Northern Illinois Huskies football